Nyalani is a settlement in Kenya Coast Province.

References 

Populated places in Coast Province